Giovanni Bentivoglio may refer to:
 Giovanni I Bentivoglio ( 1358–1402), first ruler of Bologna from the Bentivoglio family
 Giovanni II Bentivoglio (1443–1508), Italian nobleman